Lawford is an unincorporated community in Ritchie County, in the U.S. state of West Virginia.

History
The community was named after Asby Poole Law (1823-1868), a pioneer settler. He arrived with his family in 1848 and settled on a farm originally cleared by Joshua Smith in 1840. A post office called Lawford was established in 1890, and remained in operation until 1943.

References

Unincorporated communities in Ritchie County, West Virginia
Unincorporated communities in West Virginia